Enicospilini is a tribe of Ichneumonidae wasp, parasitizing Lepidoptera larva.

References 

Ichneumonidae
Hymenoptera tribes